Orthogonia is a genus of moths of the family Noctuidae.

Species
 Orthogonia basimacula (Draudt, 1939)
 Orthogonia canimaculata Warren, 1911
 Orthogonia denormata (Draudt, 1939)
 Orthogonia grisea Leech, 1900
 Orthogonia plana Leech, 1900
 Orthogonia plumbinotata (Hampson, 1908)
 Orthogonia sera C. & R. Felder, 1862
 Orthogonia tapaishana (Draudt, 1939)

References
Natural History Museum Lepidoptera genus database
Orthogonia at funet

Hadeninae